Alfred Conkling Coxe Jr. (May 7, 1880 – December 21, 1957) was a United States district judge of the United States District Court for the Southern District of New York.

Education and career

Born in Utica, New York, on May 7, 1880, Coxe received an Artium Baccalaureus degree from Yale University in 1901 then attended Cornell Law School. He was in private practice in Utica from 1903 to 1905, and in New York City from 1905 to 1929. In 1911 he helped found The New York Young Republican Club.

Federal judicial service

Coxe was nominated by President Herbert Hoover on April 18, 1929, to the United States District Court for the Southern District of New York, to a new seat authorized by 45 Stat. 1317. He was confirmed by the United States Senate on April 29, 1929, and received his commission on May 1, 1929. He assumed senior status on January 31, 1951. His service terminated on December 21, 1957, due to his death in Old Lyme, Connecticut. He was interred in Forest Hill Cemetery in Utica.

Family

Coxe was the son of Alfred Conkling Coxe Sr., who was a judge on the United States Court of Appeals for the Second Circuit, and the great-grandson of Alfred Conkling, who served as a United States representative from upstate New York and a judge on the United States District Court for the Northern District of New York. He was also a grand nephew of Roscoe Conkling, who was a Congressman and Senator from New York and boss of the state's Republican political machine. Coxe's great-grandfather was abolitionist minister Samuel Hanson Cox.

References

Sources
 

1880 births
1957 deaths
Cornell Law School alumni
Yale University alumni
Judges of the United States District Court for the Southern District of New York
United States district court judges appointed by Herbert Hoover
20th-century American judges
Gardiner family
Conkling family
Burials at Forest Hill Cemetery (Utica, New York)
Yale Bulldogs men's ice hockey players